= Kampung Ganggarak =

Kampung Ganggarak is a village in Federal Territory of Labuan, Malaysia.
